The genus Liogorytes comprises a group of large, solitary, ground-dwelling, predatory South American wasps which hunt cicadas as prey. It is related to the more common genus of cicada killers, Sphecius.

References 

Crabronidae
Apoidea genera
Hymenoptera of South America